E. sinensis  may refer to:
 Eosimias sinensis, the dawn monkey of China, an extinct primate species first discovered in China

Synonyms
 Emericia sinensis, a synonym for Cryptolepis sinensis, a plant species

See also
 Flora Sinensis